The 1995 Military World Games, the first edition of the Military World Games, were held in Rome, Italy from 4 September to 16 September.

Sports

Medal table

See also
Track and field at the Military World Games

References

1st Military World Games - 1995 Results (archived)

External links
CISM website

 
Military World Games
Military World Games
Sports competitions in Rome
International sports competitions hosted by Italy
Multi-sport events in Italy
September 1995 sports events in Europe
1990s in Rome